Bernard Edwin Doxat-Pratt (born 1886 in London) was a British film director who worked for Anglo-Hollandia and Granger-Binger.

Biography
Doxat-Pratt served with the Royal Air Force during World War I. He moved to Haarlem in 1920 with his second wife and three children. He divorced in 1929, and was never heard of again, apart from a chance encounter with Norman, his son, in 1940.

His wife Ethel and children Betty, Jack and Norman appeared in several of his films.

Filmography

References

External links
 

1886 births
English film directors
Year of death missing